Alam Serada is a township in Kuala Terengganu, Terengganu, Malaysia.

Populated places in Terengganu